Polyrhachis tibialis is a species of ant in the subfamily Formicinae, found in many Asian countries. There are 10 subspecies recognized.

Subspecies
Polyrhachis tibialis addax Santschi, 1928 – Indonesia
Polyrhachis tibialis caligata Emery, 1895 – Indonesia, Bangladesh, Myanmar, Vietnam, 
Polyrhachis tibialis completa Santschi, 1928 – Indonesia
Polyrhachis tibialis crassisquama Forel, 1913 – Malaysia
Polyrhachis tibialis nigricornis Santschi, 1928 – Indonesia
Polyrhachis tibialis orientalis Karavaiev, 1927 – Indonesia
Polyrhachis tibialis parsis Emery, 1900 – India
Polyrhachis tibialis pectita Santschi, 1928 – Sri Lanka
Polyrhachis tibialis robustior Karavaiev, 1927 – Indonesia
Polyrhachis tibialis tibialis Smith, F., 1858 – Borneo, Bangladesh, Myanmar, Thailand, China

References

External links

 at antwiki.org
Animaldiversity.org
Itis.org

Formicinae
Hymenoptera of Asia
Insects described in 1858